Sati Sumathi is a 1967 Telugu-language Hindu mythological film, produced by Chinna Rao under the Chinni Brothers banner, presented by Anjali Devi and directed by Vedantam Raghavayya. It stars Kanta Rao and Anjali Devi, with music composed by P. Adinarayana Rao.

Plot 
The film begins with Lord Srirama (Haranath) in his exile period reaching Atri Mahamuni's (Dhulipala) Ashram where his wife Anasuya (Anjali Devi) narrates  Sita (Vasanthi) a story of an ardently devoted wife Sumathi (again Anjali Devi) whose husband Kaushika (Kantha Rao) is a debaucher who gets attracted to a prostitute Mohanangi (Kanchana), but Sumathi never says a word against him and also gives away all her belongings. After some time, Kaushika is affected by leprosy when Mohanangi and her mother Nagamani (Suryakantham) cheat him, take his property and throw him out. At that point in time, Sumathi arrives to his rescue and on the guidance of Anasuya they go on pilgrimage. On the way, they reach a kingdom where its King Chandrasena (S. V. Ranga Rao) gets the divine feeling by seeing Sumathi and gives her hospitality as a brother. But Kaushika suspects their relation, asks Sumathi to undergo an Agni Pariksha test of fire to prove her chastity when she plunges into the sacrificial fire, Lord Agni of fire raises Sumathi, unharmed, attesting to her innocence. After that, once Kaushika visits Chandrasena's court where he sees a dance of beautiful girl Madana Manjali (L. Vijayalakshmi). From there onwards, he is burning out of lust when Sumathi is not able to tolerate her husband's pain, so, she requests Madana Manjali, looking at her devotion towards husband Madana Manjari agrees to bring him. On that night, Sumathi keeps him in a basket and carries him on her head, while traveling Kaushika's legs hit Sage Mandavya when he curses him to die at sunrise. Angered, Sumathi orders and stops the sunrise, when the entire universe stands still. At that moment, Trimurti's Lord Brahma (Jaggayya), Lord Vishnu (Akkineni Nageswara Rao) & Lord Shiva (Gemini Ganeshan) reach Sumathi and try to divert her, but they too are frozen. Knowing it, Trimata's Lakshmi (Krishna Kumari), Parvathi (Savitri) & Saraswati (Jamuna) immediately rush to Anasuya and plead her to protect the universe. On the request of Anasuya, Sumathi takes back her word and Kaushika dies. But with the blessings of Anusuya, Kaushika is rejuvenated as a normal person. At last, Anasuya tells Sita to follow the footsteps of women like Sumathi. Finally, the movie ends with Sita and Rama continuing their journey.

Cast 

Kanta Rao as Kaushikudu
Anjali Devi as Sati Sumathi & Sati Anasuya (Dual role)
S. V. Ranga Rao as Chandrasena Maharaju
Relangi as Bhairavudu
Ramana Reddy
Haranath as Lord Srirama
Dhulipala as Atri Mahamuni
Allu Ramalingaiah as Madhavudu
Dr. Sivaramakrishanaiah as Gramadhikari
Vangara as Raja Vaidyudu
Kanchana as Mohanangi
L. Vijayalakshmi as Madana Manjali
Suryakantam as Nagamani
Girija as Makarandam
Vasanthi as Goddess Sita
Special Appearance
Akkineni Nageswara Rao as Lord Vishnu
Jaggayya as Lord Brahma
Gemini Ganesan as Lord Shiva
Savitri as Goddess Parvati
Krishna Kumari as Goddess Lakshmi
Jamuna as Goddess Saraswati

Crew 
Art: Vaali
Choreography: Vempati
Dialogues – Lyrics: Samudrala Sr., Samudrala Jr
Playback: P. Susheela, S. Janaki, Vasantha, Swarnalata, L. R. Eswari, Madhavapeddi Satyam, P. B. Sreenivas
Music: P. Adinarayana Rao
Editing: N. S. Prakasham
Cinematography: Kamal Ghosh, C. Nageswara Rao
Producer: Chinna Rao
Presenter: Anjali Devi
Screenplay – Director: Vedantam Raghavayya
Banner: Chinni Brothers
Release Date: 5 August 1967

Soundtrack 

Music composed by P. Adinarayana Rao. Lyrics were written by Samudrala Sr. & Samudrala Jr.

References 

Hindu mythological films